This is a list of diplomatic missions of Lesotho, excluding honorary consulates. Lesotho has a very small number of diplomatic missions.

Africa

 Cairo (Embassy)

 Addis Ababa (Embassy)

 Pretoria (High-Commission)
 Cape Town (Consulate-General)
 Durban (Consulate-General)
 Klerksdorp (Consulate)
 Welkom (Consulate)

Americas

 Ottawa (High Commission)

 Washington, D.C. (Embassy)

Asia

 Beijing (Embassy)

 New Delhi (High Commission)

 Tokyo (Embassy)

 Kuwait City (Embassy)

 Kuala Lumpur (High Commission)

Europe

 Brussels (Embassy)

 Berlin (Embassy)

 Dublin (Embassy)

 Rome (Embassy)

 London (High-Commission)

Multilateral organisations

 Brussels (Mission to the European Union)

 New York City (Permanent Mission to the United Nations)

Gallery

See also
 Foreign relations of Lesotho
 List of diplomatic missions in Lesotho

References
Ministry of Foreign Affairs of Lesotho

Diplomatic missions
Lesotho